is one of the original 40 throws of Judo as developed by Kanō Jigorō. It belongs to the second group, Dai Nikyo, of the traditional throwing list, Gokyo (no waza), of Kodokan Judo. It is also part of the current 67 Throws of Kodokan Judo. It is classified as a foot technique, Ashi-Waza. A counter to uchi mata is uchi mata sukashi as well as Te Guruma. To this day uchi mata has consistently been one of the highest scoring techniques in competition.

Notes

References 

 Ohlenkamp, Neil (2006) Judo Unleashed basic reference on judo. .

Further reading

External links 
Exemplar videos:
 "JudoInfo.com" Animations and drawings
Judo technique
Throw (grappling)